Sukata Laq'a (Aymara sukaña to ploug a field as waru waru, -ta a participle, laq'a earth (soil), "earth ploughed as waru waru", hispanicized spelling Socatalaca) is a mountain in the Andes of Peru, about  high. Sukata Laq'a is located in the Puno Region, El Collao Province, Santa Rosa District. It lies southwest of Chuqi Quta and northwest of Chuta Kunka.

References

Mountains of Puno Region
Mountains of Peru